Nizhnekolymsky District (Allaraa Xalıma uluuha) is an administrative and municipal district (raion, or ulus), one of the thirty-four in the Sakha Republic, Russia. It is located in the northeast of the republic and borders with Allaikhovsky District in the west, Srednekolymsky District in the south, and with Bilibinsky District of Chukotka Autonomous Okrug in the east. Its administrative center is the urban locality (a settlement) of Chersky. Population:  5,932 (2002 Census);  The population of Chersky accounts for 61.3% of the district's total population.

Geography
The district is washed by the East Siberian Sea in the north. The main river in the district is the Kolyma. Other rivers include the Alazeya, its tributary Rossokha, and the Chukochya. There are many lakes in the district, among them Lake Nerpichye, Lake Chukochye, Lake Bolshoye Morskoye, and Lake Ilyrgyttyn. Mount Kisilyakh-Tas is located in the district.

Climate

History
The district was established on May 20, 1931.

Demographics
As of the 2010 Census, the ethnic composition was as follows:
Russians: 40.75%
Yakuts: 19.25%
Evens: 12.89%
Chukchi people: 10.87%
Yukaghir people: 8.38%
Ukrainians: 2.94%

Economy 
The economy of the district is mostly based on agriculture and fishing.

Inhabited localities

Divisional source:

*Administrative centers are shown in bold

References

Notes

Sources

Districts of the Sakha Republic
East Siberian Sea
States and territories established in 1931
1931 establishments in the Soviet Union